Yasemin Horasan (born 1 August 1983) is a Turkish former professional basketball player. She is currently the general manager of the Turkish national team.

Career
Horasan played in the season 2002–2003 for Beşiktaş J.K. and was elected Most Valuable Player of Turkish Women's Basketball League including all domestic and foreign players. To improve her technique, she was sent by her club to IMG Academy in Bradenton, Florida, U.S., the best-known multi-sport training facility in the world.

Horasan was member of the team participated at the 2005 Mediterranean Games in Almería, Spain, which won gold medal. She won the Turkish women's championship with Beşiktaş in 2004–2005.

Honors
Turkish Women's Basketball League
Winners (2): 2004-05, 2012–13
Runners-up (1): 2009-10
Turkish Cup
Winners (1): 2009-10
Turkish Presidents Cup
Winners (1): 2006-07
EuroLeague Women
Runners-up (1): 2013
EuroCup Women
Winners (1): 2008-09
FIBA SuperCup
Runners-up (1): 2009

See also
 Turkish women in sports

External links
Profile at tbl.org.tr
Player Profile at Eurobasket Women 2009

References

1983 births
Living people
Basketball players from Istanbul
Centers (basketball)
Turkish expatriate basketball people in Italy
Turkish women's basketball players
Fenerbahçe women's basketball players
Galatasaray S.K. (women's basketball) players
Basketball players at the 2012 Summer Olympics
Olympic basketball players of Turkey
21st-century Turkish sportswomen